Guandou Subdistrict is a township-level division situated in the Jiujiang District, Wuhu, Anhui, China.

See also
List of township-level divisions of Anhui

References

Township-level divisions of Anhui
Subdistricts of the People's Republic of China